The 2014 World Series of Poker is the 45th annual World Series of Poker (WSOP). It was held at the Rio All-Suite Hotel & Casino in Paradise, Nevada, USA, between May 27 – July 14, 2014. There were 65 bracelet events, culminating in the $10,000 No Limit Hold'em Main Event beginning on July 5. The November Nine concept returned for a seventh year, with the Main Event finalists returning on November 10. For the first time, the Main Event had a guaranteed $10 million first prize. The $1,000,000 Big One for One Drop was also held for the second time.

Event schedule

Source:

Player of the Year
Final standings as of October 18 (end of WSOPAP):

The Big One for One Drop

The second edition of the $1,000,000 Big One for One Drop began on June 29. The tournament drew 42 entries, 6 fewer than the first edition in 2012, creating a prize pool of more than $37,000,000. The winner of the tournament earned $15,306,668. The tournament was first conceived by Cirque du Soleil founder Guy Laliberte to benefit the One Drop Foundation, with $111,111 of each buy-in being donated to the foundation; in addition, the donation was the only rake taken from the prize pool, with the WSOP taking nothing for itself.

Results

Main Event
The $10,000 No Limit Hold'em Main Event began on July 5 with the first of three starting days. The final table was reached on July 14, with the November Nine returning on November 10.

The Main Event attracted 6,683 entrants, creating a prize pool of $62,820,200. The top 693 finishes placed in the money, with the finalists guaranteed $730,725 and the winner earning $10,000,000.

Performance of past champions

Notably absent was 1976 and 1977 Main Event champion Doyle Brunson who reported earlier in his Twitter account he will not be attending the event since the tournament hours are too long and demand too much energy. He also stated he needed to stay home to take care of his wife who was feeling ill at the time.

This was the first time since 2002 that no previous champion cashed in the Main Event, with Huck Seed making it to Day 4, the only former champ to make it to Day 4.

Other notable high finishes
NB: This list is restricted to top 30 finishers with an existing Wikipedia entry.

November Nine
Mark Newhouse made historic back to back final tables. After finishing 9th in 2013 for $733,224 he finished 9th again for $730,725. Bruno Politano was the first Brazilian to final table the main event. He finished 8th for $947,172. 
*Career statistics prior to the beginning of the 2014 Main Event.

Final Table

Records
Event #8: $1,500 Millionaire Maker No Limit Hold'em attracted 7,977 entries. It established a new record as the largest single-day starting field when 4,722 players played in Day 1a. It was also the largest non-Main Event field in WSOP history, and the second largest field overall after the 2006 Main Event.

Ronnie Bardah finished in 475th place in the Main Event, setting a new record by cashing in five consecutive Main Events. He previously finished in 24th in 2010, 453rd in 2011, 540th in 2012, and 124th in 2013.

References

External links
Official site

World Series of Poker
World Series of Poker